Malonyl-S-ACP decarboxylase (malonyl-S-acyl-carrier protein decarboxylase, MdcD/MdcE, MdcD,E) is an enzyme with systematic name malonyl-(acyl-carrier-protein) carboxy-lyase. This enzyme catalyses the following chemical reaction

 a malonyl-[acyl-carrier protein] + H+  an acetyl-[acyl-carrier protein] + CO2

This enzyme comprises the beta and gamma subunits of the enzyme EC 4.1.1.88.

References

External links 
 

EC 4.1.1